The soundtrack album of the seventh season of HBO series Game of Thrones, titled Game of Thrones: Season 7, was released digitally on August 25, 2017 on CD on September 29, 2017.

Track listing

Credits and personnel
Personnel adapted from the album liner notes.

 David Benioff – liner notes
 Ramin Djawadi – composer, primary artist, producer
 D.B. Weiss – liner notes

Charts

Awards and nominations

References

2017 soundtrack albums
Soundtrack
Ramin Djawadi soundtracks
WaterTower Music soundtracks
Classical music soundtracks
Instrumental soundtracks
Television soundtracks